Gilbert Le Bris (born March 3, 1949 in Concarneau) is a former member of the National Assembly of France. He represented the 8th constituency of the Finistère department from 2002 to 2017, and was a member of the Socialiste, radical, citoyen et divers gauche group.

References

1949 births
Living people
People from Concarneau
Socialist Party (France) politicians
Deputies of the 12th National Assembly of the French Fifth Republic
Deputies of the 13th National Assembly of the French Fifth Republic
Deputies of the 14th National Assembly of the French Fifth Republic